Ekambeswarar Temple is a Hindu temple dedicated to Lord Shiva located at Kumbakonam in Thanjavur district, Tamil Nadu, India.

Presiding deity
The moolavar presiding deity, is found in his manifestation as Ekambeswarar. His consort, Parvati, is known as Kamatchiamman.

Specialty 
12 Shiva temples are connected with Mahamaham festival which happens once in 12 years in Kumbakonam. They are :
Kasi Viswanathar Temple, 
Kumbeswarar Temple, 
Someswarar Temple, 
Nageswara Temple, 
Kalahasteeswarar Temple, 
Gowthameswarar Temple, 
Kottaiyur Kodeeswarar temple 
Amirthakalasanathar Temple, 
Banapuriswarar Temple, 
Abimukeswarar Temple, Kumbakonam, 
Kambatta Visvanathar Temple and 
Ekambareswarar Temple. 
This temple is one among them.

Kali Amman
There is a separate shrine for Kali Amman.

See also
 Hindu temples of Kumbakonam
 Mahamaham

Kumbabishegam
The Kumbabishegam of the temple was held on 22 October 2015.

Kumbabishegam 22 October 2015

References

External links 

Hindu temples in Kumbakonam
Shiva temples in Thanjavur district